Telenova are an Australian pop music trio from Melbourne, Victoria, who formed in 2020. The band consists of lead vocalist, writer and filmmaker Angeline Armstrong, and multi-instrumentalists and producers Edward Quinn and Joshua Moriarty.

Telenova released their debut single "Bones" on 18 March 2021. Their debut extended play, Tranquilize, was released on 2 July 2021.

Band members
Current members

 Angeline Armstrong – vocals (2020–present)
 Edward Quinn – multi-instrumentalist, producer (2020–present)
 Joshua Moriarty – multi-instrumentalist, producer (2020–present)

Career

2020-present: Formation, "Bones" and Tranquilize
In early 2020, Telenova were formed by Chris Walla, formerly of Death Cab for Cutie, at an APRA AMCOS SongHubs competition, consisting of Australian filmmaker, writer and musician Angeline Armstrong, multi-instrumentalist and producer Edward Quinn (of Slum Sociable), and multi-instrumentalist and producer Joshua Moriarty (of Miami Horror).

On 17 March 2021, Telenova's debut single "Bones", was premiered by Declan Byrne on Triple J's Australian music program Home & Hosed. "Bones" was released the following day, as the lead single from their debut extended play. Alongside the release, they announced they had signed with Pointer Recordings, a subsidiary of Remote Control Records. On 19 March, they announced a tour in support of the single, performing two sold out shows at the Colour Club, their debut Sydney show on 24 March at the Lansdowne Hotel, and at the Northcote Social Club on April 8. On 12 April, they were announced as that week's Triple J Unearthed Feature Artist. On 20 April, Telenova were announced as one of 20 recipients of the Music VR Backers Fund, from which  goes towards the artists using live virtual reality technologies during live performances. On 7 May, they released the single "Tranquilize", the second single from their debut extended play. On 18 May, Armstrong featured on "60 Seconds With", a segment on Triple J's Australian music program Home & Hosed, in promotion of the single. On 3 June, they announced their debut extended play, Tranquilize. Tranquilize was released on 2 July. On 5 July, they released the single "Blue Valentine". On 30 July, they were announced as part of the 2021 Queensland Music Festival line-up.

Musical style and influences
Telenova's musical style has been described as electronic pop, pop, and R&B.

In March 2023, the group released "Lost in the Rush" and announced a regional Australian tour throughout April, May and June 2023.

Discography

Extended plays

Singles

Promotional singles

Videography

Music videos

Concert tours
 Bones Single Tour (2021)
 Lost in thhe Rush Regional Tour (2023)

Awards and nominations

AIR Awards
The Australian Independent Record Awards (commonly known informally as AIR Awards) is an annual awards night to recognise, promote and celebrate the success of Australia's Independent Music sector.

! 
|-
| rowspan="2"| 2022
| Telenova
| Breakthrough Independent Artist of the Year
|  
| rowspan="2"| 
|-
| "Tranquilize" (remixes)
| Best Independent Dance or Electronica Album or EP
|

Australian Cinematographers Society Awards
On 15 November 2020, Daniel Bolt received the Best Music Video award at the Australian Cinematographers Society Awards for directing the music video to Telenova's song "Tranquilize".

Music Victoria Awards
The Music Victoria Awards are an annual awards night celebrating Victorian music. They commenced in 2006.

! 
|-
| rowspan="2"| 2022
| Telenova 
| Best Pop Work
| 
| 
|-
| Telenova
| Best Group
| 
| 
|-

References

External links
 
 

2020 establishments in Australia
Australian contemporary R&B musical groups
Australian electronic music groups
Australian pop music groups
Female-fronted musical groups
Musical groups established in 2020
Musical groups from Melbourne
Musical trios
Victoria (Australia) musical groups